Michael Lipsky (born April 13, 1940) is a Distinguished Senior Fellow at Demos, a public policy institution based in New York with offices in Washington, D.C. and Boston.  He was a program officer at the Ford Foundation after serving as a professor of political science at MIT.

He is well known in the field of public administration for his classic book about street-level bureaucracy.

Street-level bureaucracy

The concept of street-level bureaucracy was popularized by Michael Lipsky in 1980.  He argued that "policy implementation in the end comes down to the people who actually implement it". He argued that state employees such as police and social workers should be seen as part of the "policy-making community" and as exercisers of political power.

Lipsky identified several problems with street-level bureaucracy, including "the problem of limited resources, the continuous negotiation that is necessary in order to make it seem like one is meeting targets, and the relations with (nonvoluntary) clients". However, some commentators have challenged Lipsky's model. Tony Evans and John Harris argue that "the proliferation of rules and regulations should not automatically be equated with greater control over professional discretion; paradoxically, more rules may create more discretion." They also argue that the exercise of professional discretion by street-level bureaucrats is not inherently "bad", but can be seen as an important professional attribute.

Selected works

1970: Protest in City Politics: Rent Strikes, Housing and the Urban Poor, (Chicago: Rand McNally)
1980: Street-Level Bureaucracy: Dilemmas of the Individual in Public Service 
1993: Nonprofits for Hire: The Welfare State in the Age of Contracting (with Steven R. Smith; Harvard University Press)
2010: Street-Level Bureaucracy: Dilemmas of the Individual in Public Service, 30th Anniversary Expanded Edition (Russell Sage Foundation)

References

American political scientists
1940 births
Living people
MIT School of Humanities, Arts, and Social Sciences faculty